Moise Jacob Safra  (April 5, 1934 – June 15, 2014) was a Brazilian businessman and philanthropist. He co-founded Banco Safra with his brothers Edmond Safra and Joseph Safra.

Early life
Moise Safra was born on April 5, 1934  in Beirut, Lebanon, into a family of Sephardic Jewish background originally from Lebanon and Aleppo, and was son of Jacob Safra. The family's history in banking originated with caravan trade between Alexandria and Constantinople during the Ottoman Empire. The family relocated from Alepo to Beirut after the First World War as Beirut was home to an already thriving Jewish community. Eventually, the Safras decided to move to Brazil in 1952. In 1955, Moise's 23-year-old brother, Edmond Safra, and their father, Jacob, started working in Brazil by financing letters of credit for trade in São Paulo.

Career
He established himself in Brazil where he acquired citizenship and founded Banco Safra with his brothers Edmond and Joseph Safra. He was also a prominent Jewish philanthropist.

Death
He died on June 14, 2014, reportedly from heart failure, at the age of 80. He was survived by his wife Chella Cohen Safra and five children: Jacob Moise Safra, Azuri "Ezra" Moise Safra, Edmundo "Edmond" Moise Safra, Esther Safra Szajman (married to Claudio Szajman, son of ), and Olga Safra Levitin.

See also 
Safra Group
Safra National Bank of New York
Bank Jacob Safra Switzerland

References

External links
Banco Safra Brazil

1934 births
2014 deaths
20th-century Sephardi Jews
21st-century Sephardi Jews
Mizrahi Jews
Brazilian people of Lebanese-Jewish descent
Brazilian people of Syrian-Jewish descent
Brazilian Sephardi Jews
Brazilian bankers
Brazilian billionaires
Lebanese emigrants to Brazil
Safra family
Brazilian philanthropists
Jewish philanthropists